Armenian Cemetery is a cemetery in the city of Rostov-on-Don, Russia. Officially known as Proletarian Cemetery. It is situated in the Proletarian District of the city.

History 
It was opened in 1749 and was originally called Armenian Cemetery. This name is still commonly used today.

The total area of the cemetery is about 14 hectares. Central avenue that was laid from southern and western gates of the cemetery lead to St. Karapet's Church (Surb Karapet). Built in 1875, today it is the only surviving old Armenian church in Rostov-on-Don. Near the church is buried Akulina Pogosovna Aladjalova — a Rosotov philanthropist, who funded the construction of the church.

For many years of its existence the cemetery has been vandalized several times. It also had been in a state of neglect because of improper maintenance. Currently restoration works are being carried out.

At the cemetery there are also situated common graves of soldiers who died in World War II and a monument dedicated to them. The inscription on it reads: "Glory to the heroes who fell in battles fighting for freedom and independence of our homeland, 1941–1945".

Many of the monuments at the Armenian cemetery were made by eminent Italian sculptor Selvester Antonio Tonitto. He lived in Rostov-on-Don and was the owner of a workshop where tombstones and monuments were manufactured.

The cemetery has been functioning again since 1998.

References 

Burial monuments and structures
Armenian cemeteries